"Show Me Love" is a song by German DJ and record producer Robin Schulz and British singer Richard Judge The song was released as a digital download in Germany on 13 November 2015 as the third single from his second studio album Sugar (2015). The song was written by Dennis Bierbrodt, Jürgen Dohr, Guido Kramer, Robin Schulz and Richard Judge.

Music video
The music video for this song was released onto YouTube on 13 November 2015 and runs for a total length of four minutes and fifty-one seconds.

Track listing

Charts and certifications

Weekly charts

Year-end charts

Certifications

Release history

References

2015 songs
2015 singles
Number-one singles in Poland
Torch songs
Songs written by Robin Schulz
Robin Schulz songs
Songs written by Jürgen Dohr